Geoffrey Douglas (born 1944) is an American author and journalist and former adjunct professor of writing at the University of Massachusetts/Lowell.

His most recent nonfiction book (2019) is "The Grifter, The Poet, and The Runaway Train," a collection of his stories in Yankee Magazine.  Other books include The Game of Their Lives (1996, 2005), about the 1950 FIFA World Cup soccer match between the United States and England), which resulted in a movie of the same name (2005) starring Gerard Butler and Wes Bentley.  He also wrote The Classmates: Privilege, Chaos and the End of an Era (2008); Dead Opposite: The Lives and Loss of Two American Boys" (1994); and "Class: The Wreckage of an American Family(1992), a memoir rooted in his own family experience.

Much of his magazine work has been anthologized. "The Double Life of Laura Shaw" is featured in Best American Sports Writing 2001, while his story in Yankee, "A Question of Life and Death," was a 2002 finalist for a National Magazine Award in reporting.

Publications
Douglas, Geoffrey. "The Grifter, The Poet, and The Runaway Train,* Globe Pequot, 2019. (())
Douglas, Geoffrey. "The Classmates: Privilege, Chaos, and the End of an Era." New York: Hyperion, 2008 
Douglas, Geoffrey. The Game of Their Lives. New York: H. Holt and Co, 1996. . In 245 libraries according to WorldCat 
Douglas, Geoffrey. Dead Opposite: The Lives and Loss of Two American Boys. New York: H. Holt, 1995. . 
Douglas, Geoffrey. Class: The Wreckage of an American Family. New York: H. Holt, 1992.  . In 345 libraries according to WorldCat
Review, Chicago Sun0Times

References

 
http://www.imdb.com/name/nm1326238/
http://www.imdb.com/title/tt0354595/

1944 births
Living people
American male journalists
University of Massachusetts Lowell faculty
20th-century American journalists